The name Freaktown may refer to:
Freaktown (TV series), a Canadian cartoon
"Freaktown", a song from the 1991 Murphy's Law album The Best of Times
"Freaktown", a song from the 2003 Britny Fox album Springhead Motorshark

See also
Freak (disambiguation)
"Freaks In Town"